Jacek Czerniak (born 30 August 1964) is a Polish politician and political scientist. Member of the Sejm representing Democratic Left Alliance (SLD) and the New Left (after SLD merged with Spring into a new party in 2021).

Electoral history

References

1964 births
Living people
People from Świdnik
Democratic Left Alliance politicians
Members of the Polish Sejm 2011–2015
Members of the Polish Sejm 2019–2023